The News International, published in broadsheet size, is one of the largest English language newspapers in Pakistan. It is published daily from Karachi, Lahore and Rawalpindi/Islamabad. An overseas edition is published from London that caters to the Pakistani community in the United Kingdom.

Publication
The News International was launched in 1991.

The News International and its Sunday version The News on Sunday is published by the Jang Group of Newspapers, publisher of the Daily Jang (جنگ), an Urdu language newspaper in Pakistan. Mir Khalil-ur-Rehman was the founder of the newspaper and his younger brother, Mir Shakil-ur-Rahman, is the current chief executive officer and editor-in-chief.

The financial section of The News International contains stories taken from the British daily Financial Times. The weekend edition of The News International also contains a two-page magazine in the Chinese language that is produced and published by a Chinese company based in Islamabad.

Editors
Talat Aslam, a senior journalist and former editor of Herald, is currently serving as the senior editor at The News. Muhammad Umer heads the Karachi city section of the newspaper.

Staff
The reporters and regular contributors for The News International are:

 Shamshad Ahmad
 Sameen Amer 
 Ayaz Amir
 Masood Hasan
 Aamna Isani
 Roedad Khan
 Maleeha Lodhi
 Shafqat Mahmood
 Lt. General Talat Masood
 Sultan Mehmood
 Hamid Mir
 Jamil Nasir
 Sania Nishtar
 Tasneem Noorani
 Zia Ur Rehman
 Mudassir Rizvi
 Ghazi Salahuddin
 Farrukh Saleem
 Ikram Sehgal
 Sabir Shah
 Mosharraf Zaidi
 Fasi Zaka
 Salaar Khan
 Rahimullah Yusufzai
 Nasim Zehra

Magazines and sections
The magazine sections of the newspaper include:
 Instep: The entertainment section of the newspaper. Published every Sunday. Previously had a daily edition called Instep Today that was discontinued in 2020.
 Us Magazine: youth magazine published every Friday.
 You: women's magazine published every Tuesday.
 ''The News on Sunday (TNS) Magazine

See also

 List of newspapers in Pakistan

References

External links
 

1991 establishments in Pakistan
English-language newspapers published in Pakistan
Daily newspapers published in Pakistan
Publications established in 1991
Mass media in Karachi